Colin Haselgrove, FBA, FSA is a British archaeologist and academic specialising in Iron Age Britain and Europe. He is currently Professor of Archaeology at the University of Leicester. He was the Head of the School of Archaeology & Ancient History at Leicester from 2006 to 2012 and was previously Professor of Archaeology at Durham University. He is the Chair of the Archaeology Section of the British Academy.

Honours
On 4 May 1989, Haselgrove was elected Fellow of the Society of Antiquaries (FSA).  In 2009, he was elected Fellow of the British Academy (FBA).

References

British archaeologists
Prehistorians
Academics of Durham University
Fellows of the British Academy
Fellows of the Society of Antiquaries of London
Living people
20th-century archaeologists
21st-century archaeologists
Year of birth missing (living people)